"Don't Go Yet" is a song by Cuban-born American singer Camila Cabello. The song was written by Cabello, Scott Harris, Eric Frederic and Mike Sabath, and produced by the latter two. It was released on July 23, 2021, through Epic Records, as the lead single from her third studio album, Familia. The song was serviced to US contemporary hit radio and rhythmic radio formats on July 27, 2021.

"Don't Go Yet" is a Latin influenced, pop, Latin pop and tropical love song, with a scratchy flamenco guitar, luscious ad-libs and "handclapping overlapping as" beats. Lyrically, the song tells a story about being together with someone and never wanting to be apart from them. An accompanying music video, directed by Philippa Price and Pilar Zeta, was released alongside the song launch. The track received its debut performance on The Tonight Show Starring Jimmy Fallon. "Don't Go Yet" received positive reviews from critics, and reached the top-ten in seven countries, as well as the top-twenty in a further seven.

Background
Cabello first teased the song on July 14, using her Instagram account by sharing a close-up of her face along with the caption, "listos?" which translates from Spanish to English as "Ready?". On July 16, 2021, Camila announced via her social media accounts that "Don't Go Yet" would be released on July 23. Alongside the announcement, she also revealed the song's cover artwork. The singer is seen wearing a large earring and black outfit teamed with long black gloves. The following week, Cabello continued giving teasers from the "Don't Go Yet" music video.

According to Cabello, both the song and music video were influenced by "Cuban-Mexican family parties from her childhood, where 'everybody eats dinner, and then after you put on a little cheap disco ball with lights and suddenly the living room is the dance floor'".

Composition
"Don't Go Yet" was written by Cabello, Scott Harris, Mike Sabath and Eric Frederic, and produced by the latter two. The song has been described as a Latin pop, pop and tropical love song with a mix of Spanish lyrics. The Latin influenced production consists of strings, maracas, drums, trumpets, and "handclapping overlapping as" beats. Opening with "urgent", "scratchy" flamenco guitar and "luscious" ad-libs from Camila, the song plunges into swift, thumping beats. Eschewing synths and vocoders, Camila's voice is "soulful" over real instruments, from textured maracas to soaring horns.

The track also features live percussion by Cuban drummer Pedrito Martinez. The song is about the singer being together with someone and never wanting to be apart from them. The singer tells her man to shrug off his ideas of an early night and stay with her, but then explodes, as its titular phrase becomes the rallying cry of an effusive, sashaying choir. In terms of musical notation, the song is composed in the key of C minor, with a tempo of 110 beats per minute, and runs for two minutes and 44 seconds. Christine Hahn of Los Angeles Times noted that "the arrangements, especially in the choir" are reminiscent of the great Cuban orchestras of the '50s, in which a brass explosion marked the beginning of the choir and a complex percussion "made it clear that the songs were tropical."

Critical reception
The song received positive reviews from music critics. Describing the song as "fun" and "exuberant", The New York Times Lindsay Zoladz wrote "Cabello leans harder than ever into her Latin-pop roots here, but also noted that there's a "sassy rasp" to her vocals that "reminds of Doja Cat." Writing for Entertainment Tonight, Meredith B. Kile‍ named the song as "a Cuban percussion-infused, dance floor-ready single." Writing for The Daily Aztec, Trinity Bland opined that the song is a Cuban Miami music milestone, because "Cabello is carrying that torch (taking Latin pop to an international mainstream level) with the song and it can be easy to compare her to a young Gloria in this colorful single as she authentically presents her Cuban culture to fans, reaching a global audience and having fun while doing so." Furthermore, Bland also compared the song to Gloria Estefan's multiple remarkable hits, "her chant-worthy chorus reminiscent of the iconic 'O ey, o ey' from 'Rhythm Is Gonna Get You' or the emphasis on dancing like in the remarkably acclaimed 'Conga'." Cosmopolitan named "Don't Go Yet" 32nd on their list of the 55 Best New Songs of 2021.

Year-end lists

Accolades

Commercial performance
In the United States, "Don't Go Yet" debuted and peaked at Number 42 on the Billboard Hot 100 spending 9 weeks on the chart. It debuted and peaked at Number 28 on the Billboard Global 200. The track started at Number 30 on the Mainstream Top 40 chart, based on three days of airplay and would go on to peak at Number 17. The song debuted at Number eleven on the US Digital Song Sales Chart. The song debuted at Number 50 on the US Rolling Stone Top 100, marking one of the biggest debut of the week on the chart. In Canada, the song entered the Hot AC chart at number 41 based on three days of radio tracking. It ascended to Number 27 the following week. The song peaked at Number 25 on the Canadian Hot 100.

In the United Kingdom, the song peaked at Number 37 on the UK Singles Chart, marking Cabello's 12th UK Top 40 hit. In Australia "Don't Go Yet" peaked at Number 43 on the ARIA Charts. 

In Spain, the song was certified Platinum in November 2021 and reached a new peak of Number 48 on Productores de Música de España Top 100 songs chart, before peaking at Number 36 on November 11th. In Italy, the song was certified Platinum in December 2021 and reached its peak of 51 on Federazione Industria Musicale Italiana. "Don't Go Yet" has received further certifications of Gold in France and Switzerland. 

On the 20, March 2022, Don't Go Yet reached 250 million streams on Spotify, 8 months after release.

Music video
The music video for "Don't Go Yet", directed by Philippa Price and Pilar Zeta, premiered on July 23, 2021. Prior the music video's premiere, the singer shared stills on her social media. Two days prior the song's release, the intro of the music video was shared on Cabello's social media which, according to her, featured "some Easter eggs".

Synopsis
The music video opens as the singer takes a ride in a classic convertible as she switches stations on the radio. Cabello also mentioned on her Twitter account that her grandfather's voice is playing on the radio station in the beginning. The footage then morphs into a stop-motion scene of a toy car carmaking its way up a dirt road accompanied by green hills and palm trees to a grand coral pink house, where Cabello rings the door bell. Inside, a vibrant party with friends and family is taking place.

She joins the festivities as she sings and dances to the song. The singer is then shown dressed in a black dress with blue and red eye makeup, while dancing on the table. Next scene feature Camila holding on to a man's leg as she wasn't ready for him to leave. Through the video Camila switches outfits and shows different looks with bright make-up. The music video shows "the type of carefree, close-quarters family gathering, featuring many of Cabello's actual family members, including her father, sister, and cousin".

Live performances
On July 23, 2021, Cabello performed "Don't Go Yet" for the first time on The Tonight Show Starring Jimmy Fallon. For the performance, Cabello was joined onstage by a group of dancers, dressed in '80s costumes. The performance received criticism from people offended by her performing with a white dancer whose skin appeared much darker in his stage makeup. In response to the criticism, Cabello said that the intention was for the dancer to look like a character with a bad fake tan. The same day, she sang the song in a bar in New York City.

On September 7, 2021, Cabello performed the song on BBC Radio One in the Live Lounge, accompanied with Cheche Alara playing the accordion. On September 12, Cabello went on to perform it at the 2021 MTV Video Music Awards in a Carmen Miranda inspired costume, with a Brazilian music inspired dance break produced and arranged by Cheche Alara. On September 23, Cabello performed it at the 2021 Billboard Latin Music Awards, with a new high energy music production and arrangement by Cheche Alara. On October 15, 2021, Cabello performed the song at NPR's Tiny Desk for Hispanic Heritage Month with an 'El Tiny' takeover of the concert series performed at home. On May 28, 2022, Cabello performed the song in the 2022 UEFA Champions League Final.

Track listings
Digital download / streaming
 "Don't Go Yet" 2:45

Digital download / streaming – Major Lazer remix
 "Don't Go Yet" (Major Lazer Remix) 2:51

Digital download / streaming – Major Lazer Dub version
 "Don't Go Yet" (Major Lazer Dub) 6:04

Credits and personnel

Camila Cabello – lead vocals, writing
Scott Harris – writing, guitar
Eric Frederic – writing
Mike Sabath – writing, production, programming, vocals
Ricky Reed – writing, production, bass, programming
Pilar Zeta – creative direction
Pedrito Martinez – congas, percussion, vocals
Carlos Henriquez – acoustic bass, vocals
Mike Ciro – guitar, vocals
Yeissonn Villamar – piano, vocals
Manuel Marquez – percussion, timbales, vocals
John Ellis – saxophone, vocals
Marshall Gilkes – trombone, vocals
Mike Rodriguez – trumpet, vocals
Michelle Mancini – mastering
Gianluca Girard – assistant engineer
Nicky Young – assistant engineer
Manny Marroquin – mixing
Bart Schoudel – recording
Steve Xia – recording

Charts

Weekly charts

Year-end charts

Certifications

Release history

References

2021 singles
2021 songs
Camila Cabello songs
Epic Records singles
Songs written by Camila Cabello
Songs written by Mike Sabath
Songs written by Scott Harris (songwriter)
Songs written by Ricky Reed